CSC, Csc or CSc may refer to:

Awards 
 Conspicuous Service Cross (disambiguation)
 Conspicuous Service Cross (Australia)
 Conspicuous Service Cross (New York)
 Conspicuous Service Cross (United Kingdom)

Science and industry 
 Cancer stem cell
 Candidate of Sciences (C.Sc.), a post-graduate scientific degree in many former Eastern Bloc countries
 Card security code, a printed security code on payment cards such as credits and debit cards
 Central serous chorioretinopathy, an eye disease
 Circuit Switched Call, a mode of GSM/ISDN Communication setup
 Common Services Centers, an element of the Indian government Common Services Centers scheme
 Common short code, a four or five-digit number assigned to a specific content or mobile service provider, for example, to vote for a television program contestant or donate to a charity
 Compact system cameras, also known as mirrorless interchangeable-lens cameras
 Cosecant, a trigonometric function
 CSC BioBox, an EMBnet server in biology
 CSC-Plate, and International Convention for Safe Containers (1972) compliance plate
 Csc, the rare cold-summer subtype of the Mediterranean climate, characterized by cold, dry summers, under Köppen climate classification scheme

Organizations

Companies
 Charles Schwab Corporation, an American multinational financial services company
 China Changjiang National Shipping (Group) Corporation, part of the Chinese Sinotrans&CSC shipping group
 China Steel Corporation, a steel maker in Taiwan 
 Commercial Solvents Corporation, an American chemical and biotechnology company
 Common Service Centres, an Indian company
 CSC, formerly Computer Sciences Corporation, a multinational corporation providing IT services
 Contemporary Services Corporation, a security organization for sporting events
 Corporation Service Company, a registered agent service company
 Country Style Cooking, a Chinese restaurant chain (NYSE: CCSC)
 China Securities Company, now known as CSC Financial
 CSC – IT Center for Science, a Finnish information technology company
 CSC Media Group, a UK-based satellite television channel provider
 Cities Sports Connection - CSCSPORTS.com, recreational sports & charity events, serving adults in the Minneapolis/St Paul metro area.
 Intu, formerly Capital Shopping Centres, a British property company

Schools
 Castleton University, formerly Castleton State College
 Chadron State College
 Cornway Senior College, a private, co-educational, day and boarding school in Zimbabwe

Sports organizations
 Český Svaz Cyklistiky, the native name for the Czech Cycling Federation
 College Sports Communicators, a trade organization for college/university sports information professionals in the U.S. and Canada
 Team CSC, a professional cycling team from Denmark
 CS Constantine, an Algerian football club

Other organizations
 Cancer Support Community, an international nonprofit
 Canadian Society of Cinematographers
 Canadian Swing Championships
 Center for Science and Culture, an "intelligent design" conservative Christian think tank
 China Scholarship Council
 Civil service commission, similarly-named government agencies in various countries handling civil service
 Classic Stage Company, an Off-Broadway theatre
 Community Sector Coalition, England
 Confédération Syndicale Congolaise, the native name for the Congolese Trade Union Confederation
 Confédération des Syndicats Chrétiens, the native name for the Confederation of Christian Trade Unions, a Belgian trade union
 Congregatio a Sancta Cruce, the native name for the Congregation of Holy Cross, a Roman Catholic organization
 Correctional Service of Canada, a Canadian government agency
 [Council] Security Committee (of the Council of the EU)

Other uses 
 Canadian Securities Course
 Canadian Surface Combatant, a military shipbuilding project of the Royal Canadian Navy
 Close Supervision Centre - the most restrictive UK prison regime
 Corps of Staff Cadets, military unit, Australia
 Criminal sexual conduct
 ICAO airline designator for the Chinese Sichuan Airlines
 The SANS Critical Security Controls for Effective Cyber Defense